Luciana Gómez may refer to:

Luciana Gómez (footballer, born 2000), Uruguayan footballer
Luciana Gómez (footballer, born 1984), Uruguayan footballer